Clendon Thomas (born December 28, 1935) is a former American football halfback and Defensive back who played 11 seasons in the National Football League (NFL).

In college, he was a star athlete for the Oklahoma Sooners under coach Bud Wilkinson. He led the Sooners in scoring during both the 1956 and 1957 seasons, while also leading the nation in the category during the 1956 season. He helped lead the Sooners to back-to-back national championships in 1955 and 1956. He was an All-Conference selection his junior and senior years and was a consensus All-American his senior year. He also finished in ninth place in the Heisman Trophy balloting that season (the award was won by John David Crow that year).

In the 1958 NFL Draft, Thomas was selected by the Los Angeles Rams in the second round. He played for the Rams for four seasons before being traded to the Pittsburgh Steelers where he played for another seven years and finished his career. He was selected to the Pro Bowl after the 1963 NFL season.

Thomas was selected for induction into the College Football Hall of Fame in 2011.

After retiring from football, Thomas had various business ventures. In 1978, he founded Chemical Products Corporation in Oklahoma City. The company manufactured water repellents treatments for concrete and similar surfaces. It was a pioneer in the use of siloxane-based chemistry.

See also
 List of NCAA major college football yearly scoring leaders

References

1935 births
Living people
American football defensive backs
American football halfbacks
Los Angeles Rams players
Oklahoma Sooners football players
Pittsburgh Steelers players
All-American college football players
College Football Hall of Fame inductees
Eastern Conference Pro Bowl players
Sportspeople from Oklahoma City
Players of American football from Oklahoma